Kevin Berryman Casey Jr. (born June 15, 1981) is an American mixed martial artist who most recently competed in the Middleweight division of Bellator MMA. A professional competitor since 2007, he was a contestant on The Ultimate Fighter: Team Jones vs. Team Sonnen and also competed for Strikeforce, K-1, the RFA, and the UFC.

Biography
Casey was born in Inglewood, California. He began to study Brazilian jiu-jitsu in 1995 when he befriended Rockson Gracie, son of Rickson Gracie.

Casey is a supporter of CHAMP, a non-profit organization founded by his brother Keith Casey that works to build the minds and bodies of inner city youth through mixed martial arts.

Mixed martial arts career
Casey made his professional mixed martial arts debut in September 2007 for the K-1 Hero's promotion in Japan. He lost to Ikuhisa Minowa in the second round.

Following his unsuccessful debut, Casey made his first North American MMA appearance in 2008. He defeated Andrew Flores and Jimmy Mills in July and October, respectively, before taking a year off from the sport.

In November 2009, Casey made his Strikeforce debut on one of their Strikeforce Challengers cards. He defeated Chad Vance by submission. He made his second appearance for the promotion on May 21, 2010.  He lost to Matt Lindland via TKO in the third round.

The Ultimate Fighter
In January 2013, it was revealed that Casey was a cast member of The Ultimate Fighter: Team Jones vs. Team Sonnen. He won his preliminary bout over Eldon Sproat via rear naked choke. Casey was selected by coach Sonnen as his sixth pick (eleventh overall). In the next round, Casey was pitted against coach Jones' fifth pick Collin Hart. He lost the bout via unanimous decision.

Casey was then given a second chance when he was chosen as Team Sonnen's wildcard. He fought against Team Jones' Bubba McDaniel. Despite controlling the first round, Casey lost via TKO at the end of the second round when he was unable to answer the bell for the third round. Many people, including Dana White, were shocked Kevin could just quit like that. Casey attributed this to difficulties relating to acute kidney injury from his drastic weight cut for his bout.

Ultimate Fighting Championship
On April 9, 2013, it was announced that Casey would face fellow season 17 alumni Josh Samman at The Ultimate Fighter 17 Finale. He lost the fight via TKO in the second round. Following the loss Casey was released from the promotion.

Resurrection Fighting Alliance
Following his release from the UFC, Casey signed with Resurrection Fighting Alliance (RFA). He made his RFA debut on August 16, 2013 at RFA 9 against Casey Ryan. He won the fight by unanimous decision.
He fought next on January 24, 2014 against former UFC veteran Eddie Mendez.  He won that fight via TKO (Elbows) in the first round.

Metamoris
Casey replaced Vinny Magalhães on 30 minutes notice at Metamoris 3, a submission-only jiu-jitsu competition, in Los Angeles on March 29, 2014.  Casey was submitted by Keenan Cornelius via heel hook. In 2012, Casey himself had to pull out of a scheduled Metamoris competition, making his 2014 appearance his first participation with the organization.

Casey was scheduled to face Vinny Magalhaes at Metamoris 5, however was forced to withdraw just a week out from the November 22, 2014, competition due to a bloodclot in his calf that required surgery.

Return to UFC
Following his championship win at Resurrection Fighting Alliance 15, Casey was re-signed by the Ultimate Fighting Championship. He faced Bubba Bush at UFC 175 on July 5, 2014. He won the fight via TKO early in the first round due to a punch that dropped his opponent and subsequent elbows on the ground. However, Casey later failed a post-fight drug test for drostanolone, a form of anabolic steroid. Later, he was suspended for a year and fined $5,600 by the Nevada Athletic Commission.

Returning from his suspension, Casey faced Ildemar Alcântara on July 15, 2015, at UFC Fight Night 71. He won the fight by unanimous decision.

Casey faced Antônio Carlos Júnior on December 10, 2015, at UFC Fight Night 80.  The bout was deemed a No Contest just 11 seconds into the first round when Júnior accidentally poked Casey in both eyes and Casey was unable to continue.

Casey faced Rafael Natal on January 30, 2016, at UFC on Fox 18. He lost the fight via TKO in the third round.

Casey next faced Elvis Mutapčić on June 4, 2016, at UFC 199. The fight ended in a split draw.

Casey faced Sam Alvey on August 27, 2016 at UFC on Fox 21. He lost the fight via TKO in the second round.

On October 21, 2016, the UFC announced that they had cut Casey from the promotion.

Bellator MMA
On November 1, 2016, it was announced that Casey had signed with Bellator. He faced Keith Berry at Bellator 170 on January 21, 2017. The bout ended in a majority draw.

Casey faced Chris Honeycutt at Bellator 182 on August 25, 2017. He lost the fight via TKO in the second round.

On February 20, 2018 it was announced that Bellator had released Casey from the promotion.

Personal life
Casey is married to Hana Ali, the daughter of former heavyweight champion boxer Muhammad Ali and sister of WBC, WIBA, IWBF and IBA female super middleweight title and IWBF light heavyweight title holder Laila Ali.

Championships and achievements
Resurrection Fighting Alliance
RFA Middleweight Championship (One time, first)

Mixed martial arts record

|-
|Loss
|align=center|9–6–2 (2)
|Chris Honeycutt
|TKO (punches)
|Bellator 182
|
|align=center|2
|align=center|2:06
|Verona, New York, United States
|
|-
|Draw
|align=center|9–5–2 (2)
|Keith Berry
|Draw (majority)
|Bellator 170
|
|align=center|3
|align=center|5:00
|Inglewood, California, United States
|
|-
|Loss
|align=center|9–5–1 (2)
|Sam Alvey
|TKO (punches)
|UFC on Fox: Maia vs. Condit
|
|align=center|2
|align=center|4:56
|Vancouver, British Columbia, Canada
|
|-
|Draw
|align=center|9–4–1 (2)
|Elvis Mutapčić
|Draw (split)
|UFC 199
|
|align=center|3
|align=center|5:00
|Inglewood, California, United States
|  
|-
|Loss
|align=center|9–4 (2)
|Rafael Natal
|TKO (punches)
|UFC on Fox: Johnson vs. Bader
|
|align=center|3
|align=center|3:37
|Newark, New Jersey, United States
|
|-
|NC
|align=center|9–3 (2)
|Antônio Carlos Júnior
|NC (accidental eye poke)
|UFC Fight Night: Namajunas vs. VanZant
|
|align=center|1
|align=center|0:11
|Las Vegas, Nevada, United States
|
|-
|  Win
| align=center| 9–3 (1)
| Ildemar Alcântara
| Decision (unanimous)
| UFC Fight Night: Mir vs. Duffee
| 
| align=center| 3
| align=center| 5:00
| San Diego, California, United States
|
|-
| NC
| align=center| 8–3 (1)
| Bubba Bush
| NC (overturned)
| UFC 175
| 
| align=center| 1
| align=center| 1:01
| Las Vegas, Nevada, United States
| 
|-
|  Win
| align=center| 8–3
| Andrew Sanchez
| KO (punches)
| RFA 15
| 
| align=center| 1
| align=center| 2:30
| Los Angeles, California, United States
| 
|-
|  Win
| align=center| 7–3
| Eddie Mendez
| TKO (elbows)
| RFA 12
| 
| align=center| 1
| align=center| 3:38
| Los Angeles, California, United States
| 
|-
|  Win
| align=center| 6–3
| Casey Ryan
| Decision (unanimous)
| RFA 9
| 
| align=center| 3
| align=center| 5:00
| Los Angeles, California, United States
| 
|-
| Loss
| align=center| 5–3
| Josh Samman
| TKO (knees)
| The Ultimate Fighter: Team Jones vs. Team Sonnen Finale
| 
| align=center| 2
| align=center| 2:17
| Las Vegas, Nevada, United States
| 
|-
| Win
| align=center| 5–2
| Reggie Orr
| Submission (rear-naked choke)
| Samurai MMA Pro 2
| 
| align=center| 1
| align=center| 2:53
| Hollywood, California, United States
| 
|-
| Win
| align=center| 4–2
| Daniel Mancha
| TKO (punches)
| Samurai MMA Pro 2011
| 
| align=center| 1
| align=center| 1:16
| Culver City, California, United States
| 
|-
| Loss
| align=center| 3–2
| Matt Lindland
| TKO (punches)
| Strikeforce Challengers: Lindland vs. Casey
| 
| align=center| 3
| align=center| 3:41
| Portland, Oregon, United States
| 
|-
| Win
| align=center| 3–1
| Chad Vance
| Submission (rear-naked choke)
| Strikeforce Challengers: Woodley vs. Bears
| 
| align=center| 1
| align=center| 1:41
| Kansas City, Kansas, United States
| 
|-
| Win
| align=center| 2–1
| Jimmy Mills
| Submission (rear-naked choke)
| EFA: Caged Fury
| 
| align=center| 1
| align=center| 4:27
| Monroe, Louisiana, United States
| 
|-
| Win
| align=center| 1–1
| Andrew Flores
| Decision (unanimous)
| Fist Series: SummerFist 2008
| 
| align=center| 3
| align=center| 5:00
| Irvine, California, United States
| 
|-
| Loss
| align=center| 0–1
| Ikuhisa Minowa
| TKO (punches)
| K-1 Hero's: Tournament Final
| 
| align=center| 2
| align=center| 0:42
| Yokohama, Japan
|

Mixed martial arts exhibition record

|-
|Loss
|align=center| 1–2
| Bubba McDaniel
|TKO (corner stoppage)
| TUF 17
| (airdate)
|align=center|2
|align=center|5:00
|Las Vegas, Nevada, United States
| 
|-
|Loss
|align=center| 1–1
| Collin Hart
|Decision (unanimous)
| TUF 17
| (airdate)
|align=center|2
|align=center|5:00
|Las Vegas, Nevada, United States
|
|-
| Win
| align=center| 1–0
|  Eldon Sproat
| Submission (rear-naked choke)
| TUF 17
|  (airdate)
| align=center| 1
| align=center| N/A
| Las Vegas, Nevada, United States
|

See also
 List of current Bellator fighters
 List of male mixed martial artists

References

External links
 
 
 Official website

1981 births
Living people
American male mixed martial artists
African-American mixed martial artists
Mixed martial artists from California
Middleweight mixed martial artists
Mixed martial artists utilizing Brazilian jiu-jitsu
Ultimate Fighting Championship male fighters
Doping cases in mixed martial arts
American practitioners of Brazilian jiu-jitsu
People awarded a black belt in Brazilian jiu-jitsu
Sportspeople from Hawthorne, California
American sportspeople in doping cases
Muhammad Ali family